Two United States Navy ships have been named USS La Moure County, in honor of LaMoure County, North Dakota:

 , an LST-542-class tank landing ship (LST) was launched in 1944 as USS LST-883, renamed La Moure County in 1955, and struck in 1960.

United States Navy ship names